The eagle-i network (or just eagle-i) was a tool developed by a set of institutions from the United States that enables users to locate scientific resources around their country. It was retired November 4, 2021 after more than a decade in service. It used an ontology to map the resources (such as scientific equipment) to their location, facilitating reuse and collaboration. The eagle-i team has produced ontologies that take care of different kinds of resources, such as the Reagent Application Ontology.

External links 

 [https://open.catalyst.harvard.edu/products/eagle-i/ eagle-i info page
 https://www.eagle-i.net/ - former web site

References 

Science websites